Lavdie Begolli (born 19 January 1993) is a Kosovan-born Albanian footballer who plays as a midfielder and has appeared for the Albania women's national team.

Career
Begolli has been capped for the Albania national team, appearing for the team during the 2019 FIFA Women's World Cup qualifying cycle.

See also
List of Albania women's international footballers

References

External links
 
 
 

1993 births
Living people
Albanian women's footballers
Women's association football midfielders
KFF Tirana AS players
Albania women's international footballers
Sportspeople from Pristina
Kosovan women's footballers
Kosovan people of Albanian descent
Sportspeople of Albanian descent